Estadio Atilio Paiva Olivera is a multi-use stadium in Rivera, Uruguay.  It is currently used mostly for football matches.

The stadium holds 27,135 people. It was used for the 1995 Copa América and the 1999 South American Under-17 Football Championship.

On 23 June 2011, Uruguay played a friendly match in this stadium against Estonia where the locals won 3–0.

References

External links
 Google Map of Stadium
 Photo of Stadium

Atilio Paiva Olivera
Atilio Paiva Olivera
Copa América stadiums
Buildings and structures in Rivera Department
Rivera
Sport in Rivera Department